Catullus 45 is a poem by the Roman poet Catullus, describing the love between a fictional couple called Acme and Septimius. It is an over-the-top love poem that is ever so slightly tongue-in-cheek.

The meter of this poem is hendecasyllabic, a common form in Catullus' poetry.

Latin text and translation

Bibliography

 

 

 

 

 

 

 

 

 

C045
Love poems
Articles containing video clips